Morehouse Memorial Airport  is a public use airport in Morehouse Parish, Louisiana, United States. It is owned by the City of Bastrop and located two nautical miles (4 km) southeast of its central business district. This airport is included in the National Plan of Integrated Airport Systems for 2011–2015, which categorized it as a general aviation facility.

Although many U.S. airports use the same three-letter location identifier for the FAA and IATA, this airport is assigned BQP by the FAA but has no designation from the IATA.

Facilities and aircraft 
Morehouse Memorial Airport covers an area of 440 acres (178 ha) at an elevation of 168 feet (51 m) above mean sea level. It has one runway designated 16/34 with an asphalt surface measuring 4,002 by 100 feet (1,220 x 30 m).

For the 12-month period ending March 14, 2012, the airport had 30,200 aircraft operations, an average of 82 per day: 99% general aviation and 1% military. At that time there were 16 aircraft based at this airport: 94% single-engine and 6% multi-engine.

References

External links 
 Airport page at City of Bastrop website
 Morehouse Memorial Airport (BQP) at LaDOTD airport directory
 Aerial image as of January 1998 from USGS The National Map
 

Airports in Louisiana
Transportation in Morehouse Parish, Louisiana
Buildings and structures in Morehouse Parish, Louisiana